Bryansk is a rural locality (a selo) in Kabansky District, Republic of Buryatia, Russia. The population was 1,075 as of 2010. There are 12 streets.

Geography 
Bryansk is located 17 km southeast of Kabansk (the district's administrative centre) by road. Selenga is the nearest rural locality.

References 

Rural localities in Kabansky District